The Seventh Scroll is a novel by author Wilbur Smith. It was first published in 1995. It is part of the 'Egyptian' series of novels by Smith and follows the exploits of the adventurer Nicholas Quenton-Harper and Dr. Royan Al Simma. The tomb of Tanus, which is the focus of the book, refers to another novel by the author, River God.

The novel was adapted into a miniseries in 1999.

Plot summary
This book is set in the present and follows the adventurer Nicholas Quenton-Harper and his love interest, Dr. Royan Al Simma, as they uncover the tomb of Tanus.

Duraid Al Simma and his wife Royan decipher the seventh scroll from the tomb of Lostris. They are attacked and their work is stolen. Duraid is brutally murdered, but Royan escapes. Royan heads to England and convinces an old friend of Duraid, Nicholas, of the existence of the treasure in Pharaoh Mamose's tomb. Together, they travel to Ethiopia following clues laid out by Taita.

As the pair journey along together, they grow fond of each other's company. They find the tomb's location, but are attacked by the Pegasus group, which were behind attempts on Royan's life. Royan and Nicholas' work are stolen.

It is revealed that the Pegasus group is owned by Herr von Schiller, a ruthless German collector. With the help of his right-hand man Jake Helm, Colonel Nogo, and Duraid's former assistants under his command, he acquires a strong force that are willing to go to extreme lengths.

Colonel Nogo was put in charge of keeping Royan and Nicholas out of their way and Duraid's assistant was in charge of exploiting the works Nicholas and Royan discovered, while Jake Helm provided them with Pegasus' facilities.

With the help of an old friend of Nicholas, Mek Nimmur, Nicholas and Royan sneak back into Ethiopia with equipment to search for the treasure. Accompanying them is an old fisherman to help in their quest.

With spies of Herr Von Schiller's gloating around Nicholas and Royans' premises, how Nicholas and Royan manage to find the tomb and escape from von Schiller forms the rest of the novel.

Reception
The book was a best seller in America.

References

External links
Review at Publishers Weekly
The Seventh Scroll at Wilbur Smith's homepage
The Seventh Scroll at Pan MacMillan

Novels by Wilbur Smith
Novels set in ancient Egypt
Ancient Egypt in fiction
1995 British novels
Pan Books books